Frithjof Kleen (born 25 June 1983 in Berlin) is a German sailor, who specialized in two-person keelboat (Star) class. He represented Germany, along with his partner Robert Stanjek in the Star class at the 2012 Summer Olympics, and also captured a silver medal at the 2011 ISAF Sailing World Championships in Perth, Australia. Kleen has also been training throughout most of his sporting career for the North German Sailing Regatta in Hamburg under his personal coach Alan Smith.

Kleen qualified as a crew member for the German squad in the Star class at the 2012 Summer Olympics in London by placing second and receiving a berth from the ISAF World Championships in Perth, Western Australia. Teaming with his partner Robert Stanjek in the opening series, the German duo recorded a net score of 70 points throughout the entire race, but came up short for the medal podium with a satisfying sixth position against a fleet of sixteen boats.

References

External links
 
 
 
 
 
  

1983 births
Living people
German male sailors (sport)
Olympic sailors of Germany
Sailors at the 2012 Summer Olympics – Star
Sportspeople from Berlin
Norddeutscher Regatta Verein sailors
Star class world champions
5.5 Metre class sailors
World Champions in 5.5 Metre
World champions in sailing for Germany